The yellow-wattled bulbul (Poliolophus urostictus) is a species of songbird in the bulbul family of passerine birds.  It is endemic to the Philippines.

Its natural habitat is subtropical or tropical moist lowland forests.

Taxonomy and systematics
The yellow-wattled bulbul was described by Tommaso Salvadori in 1870. In common with the blue-wattled bulbul, it is alternately referred to as simply the wattled bulbul.

Subspecies
Five subspecies are recognized:
 P. u. ilokensis - Rand & Rabor, 1967: Found on northern Luzon
 P. u. urostictus - (Salvadori, 1870): Found on central and southern Luzon, Catanduanes and  Polillo Island
 P. u. atricaudatus - Parkes, 1967: Found on Samar, Biliran, Leyte, Bohol Negros and Panaon Island
 P. u. philippensis - (Hachisuka, 1934): Found on Dinagat, Siargao, Bucas Grande and Mindanao (except the Zamboanga Peninsula)
 P. u. basilanicus - (Steere, 1890): Originally described as a separate species. Found on the Zamboanga Peninsula (western Mindanao) and Basilan

References

yellow-wattled bulbul
Endemic birds of the Philippines
yellow-wattled bulbul
Taxonomy articles created by Polbot